Marion Carson Milne (January 2, 1935 – August 11, 2014) was an American businesswoman and politician.

Born in Brooklyn, New York City, Milne received her bachelor's degree from Goddard College in 1975. She owned Milne Travel, a travel agency, in Barre, Vermont. Milne served in the Vermont House of Representatives from 1995 to 2001 as a Republican. Milne died in Washington, Vermont. Her husband, Donald Milne, also served in the Vermont House.

Her son, Scott Milne, now runs Milne Travel and was the 2014 Republican gubernatorial candidate in Vermont.

Notes

1935 births
2014 deaths
Politicians from Brooklyn
People from Barre, Vermont
Goddard College alumni
Businesspeople from Vermont
Women state legislators in Vermont
Republican Party members of the Vermont House of Representatives
People from Washington, Vermont
20th-century American businesspeople
20th-century American women
21st-century American women